Ryde Sports (1888–1997) were an English football club based in Ryde, Isle of Wight.

Before their untimely demise, Ryde Sports was for many years a successful and significant club on the Isle of Wight and in Hampshire, and an important part of the town.

History
Ryde Sports F.C. was founded in 1888 and became one of the eight founder members of the Hampshire League in 1896. Although finishing at the foot of the table in the inaugural season, the club soon improved by twice finishing runners-up, they also spent the 1898–99 season in the Southern League where they finished as runner-up in the short lived Division 2 South & West Section. The 1899-1900 season was a highly successful one in which they won the Hampshire League and Hampshire Senior Cup double. After the Great War, Ryde joined the Isle of Wight League, twice being champions before returning the county fold in 1923 when they promptly won the East Division title at the first attempt. Further success soon arrived, in 1925-26 they were league champions and Hampshire Senior Cup winners the following year.

The thirties continued to be very successful for the club, twice more winning County Senior Cup 1935–36 and 1938–39. The league title eluded Ryde during this period, although a top five final position was achieved each season. It was also during this period that Ryde recorded some fine runs in the FA Cup, most notably when they twice reached the 1st Round proper; in 1932–33 they lost 0–5 away v Margate, then in 1936–37, when they lost 1–5 at home to Gillingham in front of a record 5,000 crowd. They nearly made it again in 1947–48, when after navigating their way past some tough opponents they heartbreakingly lost 0–1 at home against Trowbridge Town in the final qualifying round.

It was not until the 1952–53 season that the club suffered its first setback when, for the first time, they were relegated. After several years of consolidation Ryde returned as Division 2 runners-up in 1957–58, only to be relegated straight back again. Worse was to follow in 1963–64 when Ryde were relegated again to Division 3 but made a good recovery by immediately returning as champions; and in 1967–68 they finished as runners-up in Division 2, which was enough to clinch promotion back to the top flight.

The seventies continued to up and down for Ryde. After two seasons in Division 1 the club was again relegated in 1969–70 and in 1976–77 again dropped down into Division 3. The early Eighties saw troubled times for Ryde, twice finishing bottom of the league and having to apply for re-election. Luckily Ryde regained its place and slowly rebuilt, and in 1986 were placed in restructured Division 2 following the formation of the Wessex League.

Finally, Ryde's fortunes changed and with a powerful side the club won the Division 2 and Division 1 titles in successive seasons 1988–89 and 1989–90. For a number of years, developers had been eyeing up the clubs much loved Partlands home, and in 1990 the club vacated the premises to play at a new multi-purpose Sports Complex at Smallbrook Stadium, on the outskirts of the town. The team was elected to the Wessex League that year.

During the 1990s, Ryde hosted a series of prestigious friendly matches against Premier League opposition, most noticeably Sheffield Wednesday, Aston Villa and Southampton.

Ryde initially did well in the Wessex League where they were frequently in the top half of the table with its highest positions being 3rd in 1995–96 and 4th a year later. Ryde ran into financial problems and a player exodus saw the club struggle badly during the 1997–98 campaign. A local appeal for support was unsuccessful and Ryde, rock bottom of the table, withdrew from the competition in December 1997 with its playing record being expunged.

Honours
Southern League Division 2 South & West Section
Runners-up 1898/99
Hampshire League Division 1
Champions 1899/1900, 1925/26 and 1989/90
Runners-up 1897/98, 1898/99 and 1932/33
Hampshire League Division 2
Champions 1988/89
Runners-up 1957/58 and 1967/68
Hampshire League Division 3
Champions 1964/65
Hampshire League East Division
Champions 1923/24
Isle of Wight League Champions
Winners 1919/20 and 1920/21
Hampshire FA Senior Cup Winners
Winners 1899/1900, 1903/04, 1926/27, 1936/37, 1938/39
Finalists 1925/26 and 1935/36
Isle of Wight Senior Cup
Winners 1926/27 and 1980/81
Isle of Wight Gold Cup
Winners 1926/27, 1946/47, 1948/49, 1955/56, 1961/62 and 1962/63
Finalists 1927/28, 1928/29, 1929/30, 1930/31, 1932/33, 1933/34, 1947/48, 1950/51, 1956/57, 1960/61 and 1963/64
Portsmouth Senior Cup
Winners 1899/1900, 1900/01, 1905/06, 1919/20, 1953/54, 1966/67 and 1989/90
FA Cup
1st Round Proper 1932/33 and 1936/37

Playing records

League

FA Cup

FA Vase

Successor clubs
A phoenix club, Ryde '98 was immediately formed to play in the local Isle of Wight League but the new team never climbed out of the basement division and folded in 2004.

The town is now represented by Ryde Saints who currently run three sides in the Isle of Wight League. In 2014 they began using the Smallbrook Stadium for their 1st Team home fixtures and are ambitious to regain past glories.

Wessex League football returned to Smallbrook for the 2021/22 season, when Newport took up temporary residence whilst their new ground was being built.

External links
(http://www.fchd.info/RYDE.HTM)

(http://www.fchd.info/RYDESP.HTM)

Defunct football clubs in England
Association football clubs established in 1888
Association football clubs disestablished in 1997
Defunct football clubs on the Isle of Wight
Southern Football League clubs
1888 establishments in England
Ryde